Notropis aguirrepequenoi is a species of fish in the family Cyprinidae, the carps and minnows. Its common name is the Soto la Marina shiner. It is endemic to Mexico, where it occurs in the lower Rio Grande.

References

Notropis
Endemic fish of Mexico
Freshwater fish of Mexico
Fauna of Northeastern Mexico
Fish described in 1973
Taxonomy articles created by Polbot